The qualification for the 2013 FIVB Volleyball Men's U21 World Championship was held from 7–12 May 2013.

Competing nations

Participating teams
 Host
 
 
 
 
 Qualified through 2012 Men's Junior European Volleyball Championship

Pool A
Matches of Pool A were played in Anapa, Russia

Pool B
Matches of Pool B were played in Saint-Jean-d'Illac, France

Pool C
Matches of Pool C will be played in Sofia, Bulgaria.

Pool D
Matches of Pool D will be played in Arilje, Serbia.

References

2013 in volleyball
Volleyball
Volleyball
Volleyball
Volleyball
International volleyball competitions hosted by France
International volleyball competitions hosted by Serbia
International volleyball competitions hosted by Russia
International volleyball competitions hosted by Bulgaria
FIVB Volleyball Men's U21 World Championship
Qualification for volleyball competitions